The Journal of Intellectual Disabilities is a quarterly peer-reviewed academic journal that covers research in the field of healthcare and nursing as related to intellectual disabilities. The journal's editor-in-chief is Dr. Fintan Sheerin (Trinity Centre for Ageing and Intellectual Disability). It was established in 1997 and is currently published by SAGE Publications.

Abstracting and indexing 
The Journal of Intellectual Disabilities is abstracted and indexed in:
 Social Sciences Citation Index
 Arts & Humanities Citation Index
 Academics Premier
 Educational Research Abstracts Online
 MEDLINE

External links 
 

SAGE Publishing academic journals
English-language journals